Ronald Challis (1932 – January 2001) was an English football referee in the Football League. During his time on the National List he was based in Tonbridge, Kent.

Career
Challis became a Football League referee in 1968 at age 35. In 1975, he was senior linesman to Pat Partridge for the FA Cup Final.‡ He took charge of the Final itself in 1979. This match between Arsenal and Manchester United is remembered for three goals being scored in the last four minutes: Arsenal had appeared to be easing to a 2–0 win before United scored twice to level the score; however Arsenal then scored a third through Alan Sunderland to win 3–2.

He had two more years as a League referee before retiring in 1981.

References

Print

Football League Handbooks, 1968–1970
Rothmans Football Yearbooks, 1971–1981
†Rothmans Football Yearbook (2001), Headline, p944 (approximate birthyear and month/year of death)
‡Oh, Ref!, by Pat Partridge & John Gibson, (Souvenir Press Ltd 1979),

Internet

1932 births
English football referees
FA Cup Final referees
People from Bracknell
People from Tonbridge
2001 deaths
English Football League referees